Mykhailo Mykhailovych Verbytsky (March 4, 1815 – December 7, 1870) was a Ukrainian Greek Catholic priest and composer. He is considered to be one of the first professional Ukrainian composers of Halychyna. Verbytsky is known for composing an alternate melody to the anthem Ще не вмерла Україна (Shche ne vmerla Ukraina), which later became the national anthem of Ukraine. His first name is sometimes translated to the English version of Michael, Polish Michal, Russian and other languages (see Michael for more).

Biography
Mykhailo Verbytsky was born in Nadsiannia. Sources often differ as to the exact location of his birth, with some claiming he was born in Jawornik Ruski and christened 8 km away in Ulucz (the site of the oldest wooden church in Poland where his father was the local priest. Both are now in Subcarpathian Voivodeship, Poland.)

Verbytsky as born into the family of a priest. He was left an orphan at the age of ten, and was raised from then on by his father's brother, Bishop Ivan Snihurskiy. Snihurskiy took Mykhailo to live with him in Peremysl, where his uncle was very active: founding the city's first Ukrainian language printing press, published compilations of folklore and textbooks about the Ukrainian language. In 1818, Snihurskiy even founded a dyak-teaching institute in the city, and ten years later, a cathedral choir and music school. Verbystky was therefore placed in a very active and creative environment.

In 1833, Verbytsky entered the Theological Seminary in Lviv. Here he became seriously engaged in music, learning to play the guitar, which became his favourite musical instrument. He eventually wrote a textbook teaching how to play the guitar and wrote pieces for the instrument. Because of financial problems, he twice had to leave the Seminary, but he eventually graduated and became a priest.

In 1852 Verbytsky received a parish in the village of Mlyny, Yavorskiy county, where he would live and work for the rest of his life. As a priest he wrote many liturgical compositions, which are still sung throughout the Halychyna region. Some of these include Єдинородний Сине (Only-begotten Son), Святий Боже (Holy God), Алилуя (Alleluia), Отче наш (Our Father), and Хваліте Господа з небес (Praise the Lord from the heavens).

Music 
As a composer he helped lay the foundations for the development of modern Ukrainian music. His works are formally unsophisticated, often strophic, and usually in the minor mode; but his stage works (notably Prostachka (‘The Simpleton’), 1870) are representative of a popular folk genre that was melodically fluid, singable, pictorial and emotionally evocative. His instrumental writing does not extend far beyond the simple development of folktunes. Nevertheless, he composed 12 symphonies (overtures), on the sixth of which Stanislav Lyudkevich based an orchestral piece and a piano trio. He also composed Zapovit (‘Testament’, 1868), a setting of Shevchenko’s poem for bass solo, double choir and orchestra, the operetta Podgoryane  which was staged in Lemberg (now L′viv, 1864), and numerous sacred and secular choral works and songs. He is best known as the composer of the Ukrainian national anthem  by the words of Pavel Chubinsky Shche ne vmerla Ukrayiny (‘Ukraine has not Perished’), which in 1917 was adopted by the new Ukrainian republican government.

Compositions
Musicologist Uliana Petrus' has put together a list of 133 known compositions by M. Verbytsky. These include:
Large scale secular choral works - 30
Sacred choral works - 37
Vocal ensembles
Art songs - 10
Arrangements of folk songs - 10
Orchestral works - 18 works including 9 symphonies
Chamber works
15 works for various instruments
 Music to 12 stage works

Commemoration
In 2005 the chapel-pantheon over the tomb of Mykhailo Verbytsky was opened to mark the 140th anniversary of Ukrainian national anthem and 190th anniversary of its composer.

References

Sources
Andriy V. Szul. The New Grove Dictionary of Opera, edited by Stanley Sadie (1992).  and 
Загайкевич, Марія Михайло Вербицький - Сторінки життя і творчості - Львів, 1998

External links

1815 births
1870 deaths
People from Przemyśl County
Ukrainian classical composers
Polish composers
National anthem writers
Polish opera composers
19th-century classical composers